Vol. 4: The Redemption is a compilation album from American hip hop record label Ruff Ryders Entertainment, released on July 26, 2005. The album debuted at number 40 on the Billboard 200, selling 24,949 copies in first week (total sold 43,318).

Track listing

Charts

References

2005 compilation albums
Albums produced by Akon
Albums produced by Scott Storch
Albums produced by Swizz Beatz
Artemis Records compilation albums
Record label compilation albums
Ruff Ryders Entertainment compilation albums
Hip hop compilation albums
Sequel albums
East Coast hip hop compilation albums
Gangsta rap compilation albums